William Daniell (1769–1837), was an English landscape and marine painter, and engraver

William Daniell may also refer to:

William Daniell (died 1604), MP for Marlborough
William Daniell (1665–1698), member of the Parliament of England for Marlborough
William Freeman Daniell (1818–1865), British army surgeon and botanist

See also
William Daniel (disambiguation)